Chionodes argosema is a moth in the family Gelechiidae. It is found in Ecuador.

The wingspan is 9–11 mm. The forewings are dark purplish-fuscous with a sub-triangular transverse ochreous-white spot from the dorsum before the tornus, reaching half across the wing, and a smaller spot from the costa at three-fourths. The hindwings are grey.

References

Chionodes
Moths described in 1917
Moths of South America